Khorram Daraq may refer to:
 Khorram Daraq, East Azerbaijan
 Khorram Daraq, Zanjan